Benedikt Taschen (born 10 February 1961) is a German publisher and contemporary art collector. He is the founder and managing director of the publishing house Taschen, one of the most successful international publishers, with illustrated publications on a range of themes including art, architecture, design, film, photography, pop culture, and lifestyle.

Life and career 
Benedikt Taschen is the youngest of five children; both of his parents were doctors. From an early age he was an enthusiastic reader and comic book fan. At 12 years old, he began a successful mail order business selling used comic books from the United States. In February 1980, the day before his 19th birthday, he opened a  comic book store, named TASCHEN COMICS, in his home town of Cologne, Germany, in which he put his extensive comic book collection up for sale. Soon he began publishing comic books himself. In 1984, his venture into the art book business began with a coup: with borrowed money from an aunt, he purchased 40,000 remainder copies of English-language Magritte monograph for one dollar apiece at a trade show in the United States. Within two months, he had resold all the books at an affordable retail price of 9.95 Deutsche Mark. To Taschen, this demonstrated a gap in the art book market, until then dominated by expensive editions, and made it clear there was demand for well-designed, inexpensive, multilingual illustrated art books. Emboldened by this success, he made his first publishing foray in art books with a monograph on photographer Annie Leibovitz. By the end of the 1980s TASCHEN titles were available in over a dozen languages at prices that made art books affordable to students and collectors alike.

By the late 1990s, he had become known in publishing. When Vanity Fair’s Matt Tyrnauer deemed him, “one of the few people in business who has the courage to do exactly what he wants whenever he wants to”, Benedikt Taschen tested the theory with Helmut Newton’s SUMO, the largest bound book of the 20th century, released in 1999 with its own stand designed by Philippe Starck, at what was then the astounding price of $1500. Critics called him crazy, and predicted a major loss for the company, but by the time of the book's release 7000 of the 10,000 signed and numbered copies had been pre-sold. The book made TASCHEN's name internationally, and led to the even more ambitious GOAT — Greatest of All Time, a tribute to Muhammad Ali, published in Spring 2004. Four years in the making, GOAT weighs 75 lbs and is 20" × 20" in size, with nearly 800 pages of archival and original photographs, graphic artwork and articles and essays – including those of Ali himself. The SUMO line - oversized books with accompanying unique stands conceived by internationally acclaimed designers - is now a well established part of the company, including titles celebrating the works of Sebastiåo Salgado, David Hockney, David Bailey, Annie Liebovitz and the history of the Rolling Stones.

Today, TASCHEN has offices in Cologne, Hong Kong, London, Los Angeles, Madrid and Paris and stores in Beverly Hills, Brussels, Cologne, Hollywood, Hong Kong, London, Miami, Milan, and Paris. In 2014, TASCHEN opened their first art gallery in Los Angeles. The publishing house employs more than 250 staff members worldwide and many longtime freelance editors.

In 1998, Taschen purchased the 1961 John Lautner–designed Chemosphere House in the Hollywood Hills, long considered the most modern house in the world, and restored it precisely to Lautner's original vision, including installation of laser-cut black slate floors impossible to produce at the time the house was conceived, establishing Taschen as a key cultural figure in Hollywood circles and the world. In 2000, Billy Wilder told magazine Vanity Fair that “Benedikt reminds me of an old-time Hollywood figure. A studio head, someone who is in firm command and has his hand in everything.” In turn, Matt Weiner, creator and producer of the hit series Mad Men, described Taschen as “a miracle of taste in publishing … He consistently maintains incredible quality in content and style … He documents both the present and the past in an indispensable way.”

Art collection 

Alongside his work in publishing, Taschen has also made a name for himself as a collector of contemporary art. Initially concentrating on German artists like Martin Kippenberger, Albert Oehlen, and Günther Förg, he has since the late ’80s acquired numerous works by American artists like Jeff Koons, Mike Kelley, and Christopher Wool. In 2004, the Reina Sofía Museum dedicated an extensive exhibition to his private collection. Benedikt Taschen has continuously been listed in the ARTnews 'Top 200 collectors' since 2003, artnet ranks him and his wife Lauren first among the “10 Los Angeles Art Power Couples”. In 2013, Taschen gave 15 works from his private collection to the Städel Museum in Frankfurt to reinforce their collection’s focus on German painting of the 1980s. In 2014, Taschen donated $500,000 to the Wende Museum in Culver City, California, to facilitate the founding of an international center for the exploration and preservation of the culture, art, design, and history of the Cold War. Benedikt and his wife Lauren Taschen also donated an extensive collection of works by young American and European artists to MOCA in Los Angeles.

Personal life 
Taschen is in his third marriage, to Lauren Taschen, and has five children; three from his first and two from his third marriage. His older daughter, Marlene, began work at the publishing house in 2011 and has risen to Managing Director of the company. Taschen lives and works between Berlin and Los Angeles.

Awards and honors
 2013 Lucie Awards
 2016 Photographic Publishing Award, Royal Photographic Society, Bath, UK
 2018 Order of Merit of the Federal Republic of Germany

Quotes

References

External links
TASCHEN Books: Publisher of books on art, architecture, design and photography
"Benedikt Taschen", Charlie Rose
GOAT - A Tribute to Muhammad Ali

1961 births
German publishers (people)
Living people
Businesspeople from Cologne
German male writers
German art collectors
20th-century art collectors
21st-century art collectors